The Soles de Mexicali (English: Mexicali Suns) is a Mexican professional basketball team based in Mexicali, Baja California, Mexico, playing in the Northern Division of the Liga Nacional de Baloncesto Profesional (LNBP). The team was founded in 2005, and has established as one of Mexico's youngest and most successful basketball francises. They currently play their home games in the Auditorio del Estado and are getting their home auditorium remodeled to match their recent title.

After only 2 years of existence, the team won their first national championship against the Halcones UV Xalapa. As of 2020, the Soles are the current champions of the LNBP.

International tournaments
The Soles have represented Mexico in some renowned and important international basketball competitions in such as the Harlem Week Basketball in the Netherlands.

On December 4, 2007, Soles de Mexicali was one of the 16 teams to participate in the first annual FIBA Americas League in Mexicali, Baja California, Mexico that ended on February 9, 2008. The Soles gave an impressive performance ending in second place while Argentina's Peñarol Mar del Plata came in first.

2008-2009 season

They defeated Lobos Universidad de Coahuila (U. de C.) to advance to the Final Eight.

In the Final Eight they defeated Dorados de Chihuahua in 6 games to advance to the Zona Norte Finals (Final Four). 

On February 23, 2009, they will play Tecos de U.A. de G. in the Zona Norte Final, they will need win 4 of 7 games.

Honors

Domestic
Liga Nacional de Baloncesto Profesional:
 Winner (4): 2006, 2015, 2018, 2020
 Runner-up (3): 2008, 2016, 2017
Zona Norte Finals (1): 2009  (Final Four)

International
FIBA Americas League:
 Runner-up (1): 2008

Players

Current roster

Notable players
  Justin Keenan
  Juan Toscano-Anderson

See also
Liga Nacional de Baloncesto Profesional
FIBA Americas League

External links
Soles de Mexicali official site
Liga Nacional de Baloncesto Profesional
FIBA Americas League

Basketball teams in Mexico
Sports teams in Baja California
Sport in Mexicali
Basketball teams established in 2005
2005 establishments in Mexico